The Formative Years, were a rock/pop/indie band formed by singer-songwriter Adam Burke in Leigh.

Band history

They found success after their first single, "Radio 55", was played on a radio show based in California. Their songs were later played by the BBC in the UK. They are probably best known for songs such as "Questions & Answers", "Don't Let Go", and "Lazy". They recorded three EP's on Freelands Records and they later recorded with Liverpool musician, Billy Kinsley, on their track, "Lazy". After several tour dates and local gigs, they parted ways in mid-2007 when Adam Burke left to front a new band, New Blood Stories.

Discography

THE FORMATIVE YEARS E.P. [2007]

1. Don't Let Go

2. Draw Your Line

3. Lazy

4. Chemical Love

Recorded at Studio Studio, Whitworth and Fedora St. Studios, Liverpool

Musicians:

Adam Burke: Electric & Acoustic Guitar and lead Vocals
Ian Armstrong: Lead Guitar and lead Vocals on Track 4
Mark Watson: Bass Guitar
James Barnard: Keyboards
Michael Wilde: Drums and Vocals

SUMMER FAREWELL E.P. [2006]

1. Summer Farewell

2. Heart Attack

3. Lottery Ticket

4. Don't Let Go

Recorded at Freelands Recording Studios, Tyldsley

Musicians:
Adam Burke: Guitars, Keyboards, Drums and Vocals

INTIMIDATING SUBURBIA E.P. [2006]
1. Questions & Answers
2. Oxygen
3. Girl
4. Something Changed

Recorded at Liquid Sound Studios, Leigh

Musicians:
Adam Burke: Electric & Acoustic Guitar and lead Vocals
Anthony Halliwell: Lead Guitar
Mike Reed: Bass Guitar
James Barnard: Keyboards
Michael Wilde: Drums and Vocals

References

English rock music groups